Fraser Andrew Armstrong  is a professor of chemistry at the University of Oxford and a Fellow of St John's College, Oxford.

Early life and education 
Fraser Armstrong was born in Cambridge, England, in 1951. He obtained his Bachelor of Science degree in 1975 followed by a PhD in 1978 from the University of Leeds supervised by Geoff Sykes.

Career and research 
After his PhD, Armstrong carried out postdoctoral research with Peter Kroneck (Konstanz), Ralph Wilkins (New Mexico), Helmut Beinert (Madison), and Allen Hill (Oxford).

In 1983 he was awarded a Royal Society University Research Fellowship which he held in Oxford until 1989, when he joined the Chemistry Faculty at the University of California, Irvine. He moved to his present position in 1993. His interests are in biological redox chemistry, in particular the application of dynamic electrochemical techniques in studies of complex electron-transfer and catalytic reactions in proteins (protein film voltammetry), and most recently the mechanisms and exploitation of biological hydrogen cycling. He was the president of the Society of Biological Inorganic Chemistry (SBIC) from 2004 to 2006. With Katherine Blundell he co-edited the book Energy... beyond Oil.

Honours and awards 
1998 European Medal for Biological Inorganic Chemistry
2000 The Royal Society of Chemistry award for Inorganic Biochemistry
2003 Carbon Trust Academic Innovation Award (with Kylie Vincent)
2004 Max-Planck "Frontiers in Biological Chemistry" Award
2006 The Royal Society of Chemistry Medal for Interdisciplinary Chemistry
2008 Elected a Fellow of the Royal Society (FRS)
2010 The Royal Society of Chemistry Joseph Chatt Award.
2012 The Royal Society Davy Medal.
2012 The Royal Society of Chemistry Barker Award

References

British chemists
Alumni of the University of Leeds
University of California, Irvine faculty
Living people
Fellows of the Royal Society
Fellows of St John's College, Oxford
1951 births